Ethmia pseudozygospila is a moth in the family Depressariidae. It is found in China and Taiwan.

The forewings are overlaid with black markings on a whitish grey background. The hindwings are whitish grey.

The larvae feed on Ehretia dicksoni. They skeletonise the leaves of their host plant.

References

Moths described in 2000
pseudozygospila